Valkushyk Lock, Wołkuszek Lock is the sixteenth lock on the Augustów Canal (starting from the Biebrza). It was built in 1829 by Wojciech Korczakowski in the Wołkuszanki estuary. It is the first of three locks situated on Belarusian territory (at a distance of 1600 meters from the Polish border). In 2005–2006 it was rebuilt by the Belarusian government.

 Location: 85.00 km channel
 Level difference: 4.33 m
 Length: 44.00 m
 Width: 5.90 m
 Gates: Wooden
 Year built: 1829
 Construction Manager: Wojciech Korczakowski

References

 
 
 

1829 establishments in the Russian Empire
Locks of Belarus